Nematopogon adansoniella is a moth of the family Adelidae. It is found in Europe.

The wingspan is 17–19 mm. The moth flies from late April to June depending on the location.

The larvae feed on Fagus sylvatica, oak, Prunus spinosa and bilberry.

The synonym Tinea panzerella has also been applied to Pseudatemelia subochreella in error.

References

External links

 waarneming.nl  
 Lepidoptera of Belgium

Moths described in 1789
Adelidae
Moths of Europe
Moths of Asia